Events from the year 1987 in Pakistan.

Incumbents

Federal government 
President: Muhammad Zia-ul-Haq 
Prime Minister: Muhammad Khan Junejo
Chief Justice: Mohammad Haleem

Governors 
Governor of Balochistan – Musa Khan 
Governor of Khyber Pakhtunkhwa – Fida Mohammad Khan 
Governor of Punjab – Sajjad Hussain Qureshi  
Governor of Sindh – Rahimuddin Khan

Events 
The England cricket team's tour of Pakistan results in a conflict between Pakistani empire Rana and the England captain Gatting.
14 August – Pakistan celebrates 40 years of independence.

See also
1986 in Pakistan
Other events of 1987
1988 in Pakistan
Timeline of Pakistani history

References

 
1987 in Asia